Bridgette Andersen (July 11, 19751997) was an American child actress and child model.  She starred in 1982's Savannah Smiles, for which she received her first of four Youth in Film Award nominations.

Personal life
Andersen was born on July 11, 1975, to Frank and Teresa Andersen.  By April 1982, she lived in Malibu, California, with her parents, younger sister Angelica, and two brothers.  As an infant, Angelica appeared in television advertisements for Bank of America and Mervyn's.

A reader since age two-and-a-half, the Havre Daily News reported that six-year-old Andersen had "a staggering IQ".  Her favorite author was Ernest Hemingway, and her favorite book was The Old Man and the Sea.  A fan of the TV series Diff'rent Strokes and Silver Spoons, she decided to pursue acting, and aspired to produce and direct films as well.

Andersen died of an opioid overdose in 1997, in Los Angeles County, California, at the age of 21.

Career
During a February 1983 interview with Johnny Carson on his late-night show, Andersen related a family anecdote of her trying to climb into the television and play with Our Gang ("The Little Rascals") at age two.  Caught by her father, she was taught about actors and acting, whereafter she secured a talent agent and began acting.  She spent three years fashion modeling and acting in television advertisements.  She also appeared in television shows including King's Crossing and Washington Mistress.

In 1982, Andersen starred as Savannah Driscoll in the film Savannah Smiles.  Writer and co-star Mark Miller was inspired by—and wrote the part for—his daughter, Savannah Miller.  However, when the film was ready to shoot, Ms. Miller was too old for the part at age eleven, so Mark Miller auditioned almost 150 children before discovering and choosing Andersen for the part.  In a contemporary interview, Andersen opined that she and the Driscoll character were "like twins! We do the same things."  According to The Cumberland Times, only three months after the release of Savannah Smiles, Miller was already writing another script to star Andersen.

That same year, Andersen portrayed the six-year-old Mae West in the biographical television film, Mae West.  In 1983, Andersen explained that she preferred working in films versus television because they gave her more to do.  During the 1983–84 run of The Mississippi, Anderson was nominated for a Youth in Film Award ("Best Young Actress - Guest in a Television Series") for her work thereon.  Andersen went on to star in the short-lived CBS sitcom, Gun Shy; she portrayed Celia, one of two children won in a card game by Barry Van Dyke's Russell Donovan.

In her teenage years, Andersen had trouble finding acting work.

Credits

Awards nominations

Legacy
In 2015, actress Amber Tamblyn published her third book of poetry—Dark Sparkler—"featuring elegies to late actresses both legendary and unknown, all who suffered untimely deaths."  Andersen is the subject of one such poem, as is pornographic film actor Shannon Michelle Wilsey (1970–1994), whose stage name "Savannah" was derived from Andersen's Savannah Smiles.  Wilsey's poem is written as "a meta-poem, where she's writing for Bridgette Andersen, and telling her how they're the same."

When MVD Entertainment Group published Savannah Smiles on DVD in 2018 as part of their MVD Rewind Collection, among the bonus materials included was "a featurette about the memories of Andersen".

References

External links
 
 
 

20th-century American actresses
1975 births
1997 deaths
accidental deaths in California
American child actresses
American film actresses
American television actresses
child models
drug-related deaths in California
film child actresses
television child actresses